Chintaman Rao Dhivruji Gautam (born 18 October 1899) was the first member of parliament from Balaghat constituency of Madhya Pradesh, India. He was a member of the 1st, 2nd, 4th and 5th Indian parliaments. He was a member of the Indian National Congress political party.

He was a lawyer by profession. On 8 November 1950 he led a successful case against the State of Madhya Pradesh in favour of bidi manufacturers and workers, challenging whether it is proper for the State to pass an Act which may contravene the rights conferred by the constitution. This case is used as a text book reference among the students of Law in India.

References

India MPs 1952–1957
People from Balaghat district
1899 births
Year of death missing
India MPs 1967–1970
India MPs 1971–1977
Lok Sabha members from Madhya Pradesh
Indian National Congress politicians
India MPs 1957–1962
Indian National Congress politicians from Madhya Pradesh